"Dogwalker" is a cyberpunk novelette by Orson Scott Card.  It appeared in Isaac Asimov's Science Fiction Magazine in 1989, and was subsequently included in Card's collection Maps in a Mirror.

Short stories by Orson Scott Card
1989 short stories